Albert Latimer (born October 14, 1957) is a former American football defensive back who played four seasons in the National Football League with the Philadelphia Eagles and Detroit Lions. He first enrolled at Ferrum College before transferring to Clemson University. Latimer attended Lyman High School in Longwood, Florida. He was also a member of the San Francisco 49ers.

References

External links
Just Sports Stats

Living people
1957 births
Players of American football from Florida
American football defensive backs
African-American players of American football
Ferrum Panthers football players
Clemson Tigers football players
Philadelphia Eagles players
Detroit Lions players
Sportspeople from Winter Park, Florida
21st-century African-American people
20th-century African-American sportspeople